Quercus vacciniifolia (sometimes spelled Q. vaccinifolia), the huckleberry oak, is a member of the Protobalanus section of genus Quercus.  It has evergreen foliage, short styles, very bitter acorns that mature in 18 months, and a woolly acorn shell interior.

Description
In the field, it is best identified from its clustered terminal buds, which is characteristic of all plants of the genus. Species are more easily identified in the presence of acorns. Acorns of Q. vacciniifolia mature in 2 years (biennial maturation) after pollination. Flowers and inflorescence characteristics are not used to significant extend in this genera. Q. vacciniifolia can be easily confused with Q. cedrosensis, which grows in dry chaparrals, such as California-Mexico border south, forests of Baja California and at higher elevations on Cedros Island. Morphologically, the two species differ in their leaf margins: while Q. vacciniifolia leaves are entire to mucro-toothed, Q. cedrosensis leaves are entire or have irregular spine-tipped teeth.

Distribution and habitat 
Quercus vacciniifolia is native to the western United States, where it can be found in the Sierra Nevada of California, where its distribution extends just into Nevada, and the Klamath Mountains and southern Cascade Range as far north as southern Oregon. It grows in high mountain forests. It also dominates sections of mountain chaparral.

It is native to California, but can also be found in Oregon and Nevada. Hybridization between Q. vacciniifolia and Q. chrysolepis has been extensively reported in Sierra Nevada. Between the early and middle Holocene, 11,000 and 5,000 cal years BP, Q. vacciniifolia were an extensive shrub in the Klamath Mountains (at the northern portions of California), which had ultramafic soils. At this period, Q. vacciniifolia was a main fire developer due to its abundance, mid-height and resinous leaves. Today, Q. vacciniifolia rarely forms dense chaparral-like stands, allowing fire resistant species to grow intermittently.

Ecology
Many animal species use this shrub for food, including mule deer, which eat the leaves, and many birds and mammals, including the American black bear, which eat the acorns.

Uses 
The Quercus vacciniifolia plant is used in restoration, revegetation, and garden landscaping. It is good for preventing erosion, such as on the slopes above Lake Tahoe to slow the erosion that pollutes the lake.

References

External links
 
 

vacciniifolia
Flora of the Sierra Nevada (United States)
Flora of California
Flora of Oregon
Flora of Nevada
Flora of the Klamath Mountains
Natural history of the California Coast Ranges
Garden plants of North America
Drought-tolerant plants
Plants described in 1873
Flora without expected TNC conservation status